Gynoeryx meander is a moth of the family Sphingidae. It is known from Madagascar.

References

Gynoeryx
Moths described in 1875
Moths of Madagascar
Moths of Africa